Watchlist or watch list may refer to:

Watchlist (NGO), the Watchlist on Children and Armed Conflict, a non-governmental organization
Watchlist (wiki), a tool for monitoring changes on wikis
Interpol Terrorism Watch List, a list of fugitives and suspected terrorists

See also
 Computer-Assisted Passenger Prescreening System, a watchlist maintained by the Transportation Security Administration in United States
No Fly List, list of people suspected of some involvement with terrorism
 "Priority Watch List" and a "Watch List" of the Special 301 Report
Terrorist Screening Database (aka. Central Terrorist Watchlist), FBI's list of millions of people suspected of some involvement with terrorism